Euseius notatus is a species of mite in the family Phytoseiidae.

References

notatus
Articles created by Qbugbot
Animals described in 1968